Earl Boen (August 8, 1941 – January 5, 2023) was an American actor, best known as criminal psychologist Dr. Peter Silberman in The Terminator (1984), Terminator 2: Judgment Day (1991), and Terminator 3: Rise of the Machines (2003).

Boen was also very active in the voice-over field. He was known for voicing characters such as Mr. Bleakman in Clifford the Big Red Dog, Police Chief Kanifky in Bonkers, the narrator and King Terenas Menethil II in World of Warcraft, Señor Senior, Senior in Kim Possible, and LeChuck in the Monkey Island series.

Early life
Earl Boen was born on August 8, 1941 in New York City.

Career
Boen is known to many TV viewers as the Harper family's pastor, the Rev. Lloyd Meechum on the 1980s sitcom Mama's Family. His character was featured in several of the most memorable episodes (on both the network and syndicated versions). He also appeared as a clergyman in episodes of The Golden Girls, The Golden Palace, The Wonder Years, Boy Meets World, Seinfeld and Three's Company. He also appeared as Willie's boss in ALF, and as Patrick Morrison in the Matlock episode "The Cult". Boen commonly plays doctors in movie and television roles. He also played Jim Petersen, Angela Bower's boss on the show Who's The Boss?. Additionally, Boen had a recurring role as Dr. Kramer in the 1990s Fox series Get a Life. Boen also appeared (alongside Tom Jones) in an episode of The Fresh Prince of Bel-Air in 1993 as a Princeton admissions agent. He also voiced the omnipotent alien Nagilum in a second season episode of Star Trek: The Next Generation.

Other films in which he appeared include The Main Event (1979), Battle Beyond the Stars (1980), 9 to 5 (1980), Soggy Bottom, U.S.A. (1981), The Man with Two Brains (1983), To Be or Not to Be (1983), Alien Nation (1988), Marked for Death (1990), Naked Gun : The Final Insult (1994), and Nutty Professor II: The Klumps (2000).

In 1987, came his first voice role as Taurus in the direct to video G.I. Joe: The Movie. Some of his most well-known voice roles were villainous pirate LeChuck from the Monkey Island series of adventure games. He also provided the introductions for World of Warcraft and its expansions, voiced Magtheridon in World of Warcraft: The Burning Crusade and King Terenas Menethil II in World of Warcraft: Wrath of the Lich King, including the cinematic trailer and ending cutscene for that expansion, which featured the iconic line "no king rules forever, my son." He played Hekima the Wise in the next expansion, World of Warcraft: Cataclysm, and is credited as providing additional voices and narration work up to the release of World of Warcraft: Legion in 2016. He also appeared in the cult classic game Psychonauts.

Boen was also well known for voicing the dramatic thespian Edwin Blackgaard in Focus on the Family's "Adventures in Odyssey", as well as Edwin's nefarious twin brother Regis. He also portrayed Sergei Gurlukovich in Metal Gear Solid 2: Sons of Liberty, a role that he later reprised in the Metal Gear Solid 2: Substance rerelease and the official digital graphic novel. Other roles include Colossus in X-Men: Legends and a variety of characters across multiple Star Trek titles, including Bridge Commander and Armada II.

Boen's voice was heard on the Disneyland Railroad from 2002 until 2016 and on the Walt Disney World Railroad from 2002 until late 2010.

Boen retired from screen acting in 2003, but continued his work as a voice actor in radio, television cartoons and video games until 2017.

Personal life and death
Boen married actress Carole Kean in 1970. She died on April 23, 2001, from ovarian cancer at the age of 58. Together they have a daughter.

Boen was diagnosed with lung cancer in the fall of 2022. He died in Hawaii on January 5, 2023, at the age of 81. Boen is survived by his second wife Cathy.

Filmography

Live-action

Film

Animation

Video games

Radio

Awards and nominations

References

External links
 
 
 

1941 births
2023 deaths
Deaths from lung cancer in the United States
Deaths from cancer in Hawaii
Male actors from Colorado
People from Pueblo, Colorado
American male film actors
American male radio actors
American male television actors
American male video game actors
American male voice actors
20th-century American male actors
21st-century American male actors